The 1980 All-Ireland Senior Football Championship Final was the 93rd All-Ireland Final and the deciding match of the 1980 All-Ireland Senior Football Championship, an inter-county Gaelic football tournament for the top teams in Ireland. 

Roscommon had beaten Armagh in their semi-final.

Roscommon went five points up early on, John 'Jigger' O'Connor getting a goal after 35 seconds. Mikey Sheehy pegged a goal back and in a very scrappy game, (64 frees) the more experienced Kerry team ran out three-point victors.

Towards the end of the first half, Kerry player Pat Spillane lay down injured and referee Seamus Murray tried to raise him from the ground. Commentator Michael O'Hehir also doubted the authenticity of Spillane's injury, in remarks that angered the Kerry County Board.

Kerry completed a three-in-a-row sequence of titles; Tom Cryan wrote in the Irish Independent: "The first half has to be one of the worst ever seen in an All-Ireland final", Donal Carroll wrote in the same publication: "The statistics are chillingly disturbing in the awarding of 64 frees — 41 to Kerry — and six bookings, three to each side – made an utter shambles of what should have been an interesting trial of strength"; in 2022, Martin Breheny listed it among "five of the worst" All-Ireland SFC finals since 1972.

This was the first of five All-Ireland football titles won by Kerry in the 1980s.

References

All-Ireland Senior Football Championship Final
All-Ireland Senior Football Championship Final, 1980
All-Ireland Senior Football Championship Finals
All-Ireland Senior Football Championship Finals
Kerry county football team matches
Roscommon county football team matches